Moutiers-sur-le-Lay (literally Moutiers on the Lay) is a commune in the Vendée department in the Pays de la Loire region in western France.

Geography
The village lies on the left bank of the river Lay, which flows southwestward through the southern part of the commune.

See also
Communes of the Vendée department

References

Communes of Vendée